Mungaru Male is a 2006 Indian Kannada-language romantic drama film co-written and directed by Yogaraj Bhat, and produced by E. Krishnappa. It stars Ganesh, Pooja Gandhi and Anant Nag. It was the first film in South Indian Cinema to collect 70 crore and 75 crore gross. The film is believed to have shaped and strengthened the careers of Ganesh, Pooja Gandhi, director Yograj Bhat, lyricist Jayant Kaikini, choreographers  A. Harsha, Imran Sardaria, composer Mano Murthy and others in Kannada cinema, and made Bollywood playback singers Sonu Nigam, Kunal Ganjawala, Udit Narayan, Sunidhi Chauhan and Shreya Ghoshal popular in Karnataka.

It was the first film in India (for any language) to be screened continuously for over one year in a multiplex, and holds the record for the longest-running film at a multiplex in addition to having one of the highest recorded box-office collections in Kannada cinema. According to Bangalore Mirror, it was the first Kannada film to cross the ₹50 crore box office collection mark. It was the first film to ran over 865-days in history of Karnataka. and collected an estimated 50– 75 crore (500–750 million). The Income Tax department alleged that the movie had collected  and demanded tax on that amount. It ran for a record 460 days at the PVR Multiplex.  Also it holds a national record in Indian Cinema for running more than one year in PVR.

It was remade in 2008 in Telugu as Vaana, in 2008 in Bengali as Premer Kahini, in 2009 in Odia as Romeo - The Lover Boy  and in 2017 in Marathi as Premay Namaha. A sequel to the film titled Mungaru Male 2 was released in 2016.
This movie marked the Kannada debut of actress Pooja Gandhi (who was introduced as Sanjana Gandhi).

Plot 

Preetham is on a visit to Eva Mall in Bangalore; amidst a heavy wind, he spots a pretty girl, Nandini. While staring at her, he inadvertently falls into a manhole. Nandini rescues him from the pit, but in the process loses her heart-shaped watch she had just bought. While accompanying his mother to Madikeri in Coorg, Preetam confronts a man named Jaanu. Jaanu, who has been following Nandini, beats Preetam thinking that he is in love with Nandini. Preetam, unaware that Jaanu has vowed not to allow anyone near Nandini, trashes Jaanu and his gang in revenge.

In Madikeri, Preetam unexpectedly meets Nandini. He identifies himself and expresses his love towards her and offers to tie the watch as an indication for their marriage. Nandini, who is already engaged, rejects his request. Nonetheless, Preetam vows to marry Nandini if she meets him again. In the meantime, Preetam discovers that his nearly-deaf host in Madikeri, Col. Subbaiah, is Nandini's father and that Nandini's marriage is only a week away. Dejected, Preetam throws Nandini's heart-shaped watch away. But Nandini telephones him and taunts him to return. Delighted, Preetam goes in search of her watch and spots a rabbit, which he calls Devadas, and brings it along with the watch.

Since Nandini's friends are due to arrive from Mumbai for the marriage, Preetam takes Nandini to the railway station. The train is delayed by five hours, so Nandini and Preetam decide to visit a nearby hill-temple. While returning from the temple, Preetam and Nandini are caught in rain. An old couple offers Preetam and Nandini to take shelter inside their hut. Preetam, still in two minds about expressing his love to Nandini, grabs a couple of toddy bottles, goes out in the rain and starts drinking. However, when Nandini walks towards him, offering an umbrella, he is under a state of intoxication and tells Nandini that he'd better stay away from Nandini to remain a decent boy, rather than to propose or elope with her. Nandini is now in love with Preetam and is in a dilemma as her wedding is due in a few days. She asks him to take her to the top of a waterfall where she expresses her love for him while standing at the edge.

Preetam, intent on marrying Nandini, takes Col. Subbaiah for a morning jog to discuss the matter. But Col. Subbaiah, a heart patient, tells Preetham that he's expected to die anytime and his only aim in life is to get Nandini married to Gautam also an army officer who saved his life one day during  a war. Also he sees the fear in Nandini's mother when she sensed Nandini could be in love with someone else as the wedding was to happen the next day and all invitations were out. Also she felt it would be very unfair to a good person like Gautham. Hence Preetam decides to sacrifice his love for a greater good and let Gautham marry Nandini. The night before the wedding, an extremely depressed Preetam goes to a road-side bar to drink. Gautam arriving for his wedding cemoney, with heavy rains and interior broken roads of Coorg, asks the bar-owner for directions to Col. Subbaiah's home; when Jaanu tries to kill Gautam, Preetam saves Gautam and convinces Jaanu that only Gautam is the best person to marry Nandini.

The next day, Preetam brings Gautam to the marriage house as Gautam was getting late and his car had issue. They reach just in time for the ceremony, but Preetam declines to attend. Gautam asks for the heart-shaped watch as a remembrance but Preetham leaves, unwilling to part with it. There is a search for Preetam, and only his mother knows the truth about his love, but hides her worry.

Resignedly, Preetam watches the arch proclaiming "Gautham weds Nandini" and the marriage taking place in Kodava style. As he leaves, he spots Devadas and takes the rabbit with him. Driving towards Bangalore, Preetham confides in Devdas as to how much he loved Nandini, how he wished he had a life with her, and soon realizes that Devdas has died. The film ends with Preetham burying Devdas.

Cast
 Ganesh as Preetam
 Pooja Gandhi as Nandini, Preetam's love interest
 Ananth Nag as Colonel Subbaiah, Nandini's father
 Padmaja Rao as "Bubbly" Babita, Nandini's mother
 Jai Jagadish as Preetam's father
 Sudha Belawadi as Kamala, Preetam's mother
 Diganth as Gautam, Nandini's fiancé
 Neenasam Ashwath as Jolly
 Sanchita Shetty as Nandini's friend

Production

Development
Director Yograj Bhat, who had earlier dabbled in advertising and corporate films, began working on the script of Mungaru Male. He read the script to Puneeth Rajkumar and Ramya who rejected it. Ganesh introduced Yograj Bhat to producer E. Krishnappa, who agreed to finance the film. Bhat cast a relatively unknown actress, Pooja Gandhi, for the lead female role in the film.

Filming
Approximately 80% of the scenes were filmed in the rain. Shooting locations included major part in Sakaleshpura, Madikeri, Jog Falls Sagara, and Gadag. Krishna, the cameraman, was a part-time photographer prior to the film.

Soundtrack 

Mano Murthy scored the film's background music and its soundtrack, lyrics for which was penned by Jayant Kaikini, Yogaraj Bhat, Kaviraj and Hrudaya Shiva. The soundtrack album consists of seven tracks. Anand Audio bought the distribution rights for 500,000. It was released on 6 November 2006 in Bangalore.

Upon the album's release, it topped the charts with the song "Anisuthide" receiving significant radio and TV air time. It was reported that by mid-May 2007, over 200,000 copies were sold in compact discs alone. Hindustan Times reported, "The film has just completed seven weeks, but audio sales have broken all earlier records. Composer Mano Murthy has once again created musical magic with songs like 'Anisuthidhe' and 'Onde Ondu Saari'."

The success of the film's soundtrack, especially the track "Anisutide", further propelled Nigam's playback singing career in Kannada cinema. With the song, lyricist and writer Jayant Kaikini's reputation as a writer of romantic songs further elevated, and is considered one of his best.

Critical response
Rediff.com's critic awarded it a three-star rating and praised its cinematography, technical values, and the acting of Ganesh and Anant Nag.

Indicine.com's critic rated the film 4 out of 5, describing Ganesh as the "life and soul of the movie". Other praise was directed at Gandhi, "Sanjana makes a confident debut. Veteran actor Anant Nag with his brilliant comic timing provides able support". S. Shiva Kumar of The Hindu wrote, "Anant Nag never ceases to amaze. Playing a deaf, trigger-happy ex-serviceman, his dialogue delivery and sense of timing are spot on. TV anchor turned actor Ganesh has a casual style, which audiences seem to be lapping up."

Box office

Then film went on to gross 50–75 crore (500–750 million) by the end of its theatrical run of 865 days. The film has also been released with 150 prints in Karnataka. This was the first Indian film which ran over a year in a multiplex: PVR cinemas Bangalore. Mungaaru Male was being screened at full theatres, one year after its release. According to reports it was the first Kannada film to touch ₹50 crore club in history of Kannada film industry.

Overseas 
Mungaru Male was released to 10 countries including the United States, Australia, Singapore, New Zealand, UK, Hong Kong and Dubai. It was the highest-grossing Kannada film overseas. It had made  in the US alone.

Home media
The satellite rights were acquired by television channel Star Suvarna for 36 million. The DVD of the film with 5.1 surround sound was distributed by Anand Video.

Awards and nominations
The film was awarded the Best Kannada Film award for the year 2006–07 by the Government of Karnataka (seven awards in total from the Government of Karnataka). It won three Filmfare awards: best music, best direction and best film. However, it did not win a single national award from the Government of India.

Legacy
The success of Mungaru Male turned Ganesh and Pooja Gandhi into most sought-after actors in Kannada cinema. Ganesh had back-to-back commercial successes in Cheluvina Chittara (2007), Hudugaata (2007) and Krishna (2007). Ganesh and Bhat delivered two consecutive films that emerged as commercial successes, the other being Gaalipata (2008). The film also proved to be a launchpad for the career of actress Pooja Gandhi. And Gandhi also delivered back-to-back commercially superhit films such as Milana (2007), Krishna (2007), Taj Mahal (2008) and Budhivanta (2008).

Producer E Krishnappa and distributor Jayanna were raided by the Income Tax department multiple times. The department alleged that the film had collected Rs 67.5 crore and demanded tax for that amount. After Mungaru Male, two of Ganesh's next films also became super hits.

Book
Bhat wrote about the making of Mungaru Male in the book Haage Summane, which was released on the occasion of the silver jubilee celebration for the movie.

Remakes
The movie was remade in Telugu in 2008 as Vaana, in Bengali in 2008 as Premer Kahini , in Odia in 2009 as Romeo - The Lover Boy  and in Marathi in 2017 as Premay Namaha.

Sequel
It was announced in July 2014 that Shashank would be directing the sequel of the film, titled Mungaru Male 2. Ganesh reprised his role in the film, produced by J. Gangadhar under the banner of E. K. Pictures. The sequel was released in 2016.

Notes

References

External links
 

2006 films
Kannada films remade in other languages
Films scored by Mano Murthy
2006 romantic drama films
2000s romantic musical films
Films directed by Yogaraj Bhat
Indian romantic drama films
Indian romantic musical films
2000s Kannada-language films